Oakland is an unincorporated community in Limestone County, Alabama, United States. It is in the eastern part of the county near Madison at the intersection of Huntsville Brownsferry Road (formerly known as County Road 24) and County Road 119, as opposed to Oakland, Limestone County, Alabama which is just west of Athens.

Oakland is named after the Oakland Spring, and the Oakland Spring Branch which is west of the community. The area is likely soon to be acquired into Madison city's outer borders or that of the Huntsville borders in Limestone county. The community is made up of about 18 buildings, of which 3 are churches and the rest are houses.

References

Unincorporated communities in Limestone County, Alabama
Unincorporated communities in Alabama